Ingus Baušķenieks (born December 30, 1956) is a Latvian musician known as a member of Dzeltenie Pastnieki and as a solo artist. He is a multi-instrumentalist, with the bass guitar being his primary instrument in band engagements. He is also known for his proficiency in home recording and tape editing.

He is the son of the noted Latvian painter Auseklis Baušķenieks (1910–2007).

Discography

References 

1956 births
Living people
Bass guitarists
Dzeltenie Pastnieki members
Musicians from Riga
Riga State Gymnasium No.1 alumni